Dos Palos Y (Dos Palos, Spanish for "Two Timbers") is a census-designated place at the "Y" intersection of California SR 152 and Highway 33 in Merced County, California. As of the 2020 census, the population was 310.

In 1966, the local post office was moved to Dos Palos Y from Santa Rita Park,  to the east. The community is about halfway between California's main north–south freeways, Interstate 5 and Highway 99.

Geography
According to the United States Census Bureau, the CDP covers an area of 1.6 square miles (4.1 km), all of it land.

Land use in this part of the San Joaquin Valley is dominated by farms and orchards. In spring and fall, migratory birds visit Department of Fish and Wildlife sanctuary wetlands in the region.

Demographics

The 2010 United States Census reported that Dos Palos Y had a population of 323. The racial makeup of Dos Palos Y was 225 (69.7%) White, 1 (0.3%) African American, 8 (2.5%) Native American, 1 (0.3%) Asian, 0 (0.0%) Pacific Islander, 82 (25.4%) from other races, and 6 (1.9%) from two or more races. Hispanic or Latino of any race were 197 persons (61.0%).

The Census reported that 323 people (100% of the population) lived in households, 0 (0%) lived in non-institutionalized group quarters, and 0 (0%) were institutionalized.

There were 100 households, out of which 41 (41.0%) had children under the age of 18 living in them, 51 (51.0%) were opposite-sex married couples living together, 17 (17.0%) had a female householder with no husband present, 7 (7.0%) had a male householder with no wife present.  There were 6 (6.0%) unmarried opposite-sex partnerships, and 2 (2.0%) same-sex married couples or partnerships. 22 households (22.0%) were made up of individuals, and 9 (9.0%) had someone living alone who was 65 years of age or older. The average household size was 3.23.  There were 75 families (75.0% of all households); the average family size was 3.77.

The population was spread out, with 98 people (30.3%) under the age of 18, 35 people (10.8%) aged 18 to 24, 65 people (20.1%) aged 25 to 44, 76 people (23.5%) aged 45 to 64, and 49 people (15.2%) who were 65 years of age or older.  The median age was 35.2 years. For every 100 females, there were 107.1 males.  For every 100 females age 18 and over, there were 108.3 males.

The homeowner vacancy rate was 2.0%; the rental vacancy rate was 12.1%.  163 people (50.5% of the population) lived in owner-occupied housing units and 160 people (49.5%) lived in rental housing units.

References

External links
Dos Palos Y's General Plan

Census-designated places in Merced County, California
Census-designated places in California